Horse tail, horsetail  or horse's tail may refer to:

the tail of a horse
Equisetidae, a subclass of living and extinct plants known as horsetails
Equisetales, the single extant order of Equisetidae
Equisetaceae, the horsetail family, the only extant family of Equisetales
Equisetum, horsetail, the only living genus in Equisetaceae
 Cauda equina ('horse's tail'), a bundle of spinal nerves and spinal nerve rootlets in humans
 a type of waterfall

See also
 Horsetail Falls (disambiguation)
Hippuris, or mare's tail, a flowering plant
 Ponytail, a human hairstyle
 Tug (banner), a pole with circularly-arranged horse tail hairs, historically flown by Turkic tribes